Daisy is a city in Evans County, Georgia, United States. The population was 129 at the 2010 census.

History

The city of Daisy, Georgia was established in 1890, the same year that the Savannah and Western Railroad built a railroad line through the area. The town was going to be known as Conley, in honor of Rev. W.F. Conley, a Methodist minister, but the postal service rejected the application for a post office on May 17, 1890 because of the existence of another Conley, Georgia. The people of the community then decided on Daisy, naming their town for Daisy Leola Edwards, daughter of Thomas Jefferson Edwards and the granddaughter of W.F. Conley. The application for a post office under this name was made on July 14, 1890 and approved on August 26, 1890.

Geography

Daisy is located at  (32.150060, −81.835823).

Climate
Daisy has a humid subtropical climate according to the Köppen classification. The city has hot and humid summers with average highs of 94 degrees and lows of 70 degrees in July. Winters are mild with average January highs of 61 degrees and lows of 36 degrees. Winter storms are rare, but they can happen on occasion.

Demographics

As of the census of 2000, there were 126 people, 53 households, and 33 families residing in the city. The racial makeup of the city was 76.98% White and 23.02% African American.

There were 53 households, out of which 22.6% had children under the age of 18 living with them, 100% were married couples living together, 5.7% had a female householder with no husband present, and 37.7% were non-families. 37.7% of all households were made up of individuals, and 18.9% had someone living alone who was 65 years of age or older. The average household size was 2.38 and the average family size was 3.18.

In the city, the population was spread out, with 26.2% under the age of 18, 4.8% from 18 to 24, 23.8% from 25 to 44, 29.4% from 45 to 64, and 15.9% who were 65 years of age or older. The median age was 40 years. For every 100 females, there were 106.6 males. For every 100 females age 18 and over, there were 106.7 males.

The median income for a household in the city was $24,167, and the median income for a family was $24,722. Males had a median income of $46,250 versus $15,313 for females. The per capita income for the city was $47,166. There were 4.8% of families and 8.0% of the population living below the poverty line, including no under eighteens and 22.2% of those over 64.

References

External links
 Daisy United Methodist Church historical marker

Cities in Georgia (U.S. state)
Cities in Evans County, Georgia